Gyraulus costulatus is a species of air-breathing freshwater snail, aquatic pulmonate gastropod mollusk in the family Planorbidae, the ram's horn snails.

Distribution
Gyraulus costulatus is widespread in Africa and distribution of Gyraulus costulatus include
Algeria, Angola, Benin, Botswana, Burkina Faso, Burundi, Cameroon, Central African Republic, Chad, Congo, Egypt, mainland of the Equatorial Guinea, Eswatini, Ethiopia, Gabon, Gambia, Ghana, Guinea, Guinea-Bissau, Kenya, Liberia, Malawi, Mali, Mauritania; Mozambique, Namibia, Niger, Nigeria, Senegal, Sierra Leone, South Africa, Sudan, Tanzania, Togo, Uganda, Zambia and Zimbabwe.

Description 
All species within family Planorbidae have sinistral shells.

References

External links 

costulatus
Gastropods of Africa
Invertebrates of Equatorial Guinea
Freshwater snails
Gastropods described in 1848
Taxa named by Christian Ferdinand Friedrich Krauss